Dinocheirus is a genus of pseudoscorpions in the family Chernetidae.

Species include:

References

Chernetidae